This is a list of nature centers and environmental education centers in the state of Minnesota.

Current nature centers

Former nature centers
 Agassiz Audubon Society Center, Warren
 Maltby Nature Preserve Science Center, Randolph, Goodhue County, filed Chapter 11 bankruptcy on May 12, 2009, due to a decrease in donations

Resources

 Minnesota Association for Environmental Education

External links
 Map of nature centers and environmental education centers in Minnesota

 
Nature center
Minnesota